Hymn o Perle is a poetry collection in Polish by Czesław Miłosz which means "Hymn of the Pearl". It was first published in 1982.
 
The title may refer to Hymn of the Pearl, a passage of the apocryphal Acts of Thomas.

References

1982 poetry books
Poetry by Czesław Miłosz
Polish poetry collections